Sha'ar Menashe (lit. Menashe Gate) is a psychiatric medical centre in northern Israel. Located near Pardes Hanna-Karkur with an area of 740 dunams, it falls under the jurisdiction of Menashe Regional Council. It is the location of Sha'ar Menashe psychiatric hospital.

History
In the past after 1949 there was here a camp for first absorption of immigrants from Yemen and Iraq and a village for elderly people. In 2007 the hospital had in treatment 1,100 patients and was the largest psychiatric institution in Israel.

References

External links
Official website

Villages in Israel
Psychiatric hospitals in Israel
Populated places established in 1949
Hospitals established in 1949
1949 establishments in Israel
Populated places in Haifa District
Iraqi-Jewish culture in Israel
Yemeni-Jewish culture in Israel